Sarcodon catalaunicus is a species of tooth fungus in the family Bankeraceae. Found in Mediterranean Europe, it was described as new to science in 1937 by French mycologist René Maire. The type collection was found growing under Quercus ilex in Santa Coloma de Farners (Catalonia, Spain).

References

External links

Fungi described in 1937
Fungi of Europe
catalaunicus